The 126th Infantry Division (German: 126. Infanterie-Division) was a German division in World War II. It was formed on 18 October 1940 in Sennelager.

The division was formed from elements of the 11th Infantry Division, 253rd Infantry Division and the non-motorized elements of the 16th Motorized Infantry Division. It fought at Demyansk, staraya Russa and Leningrad before ending the war in the Courland pocket.

Commanding officers
 General der Infanterie Paul Laux (5 October 1940 – 10 October 1942)
 Generalleutnant Harry Hoppe (10 October 1942 – 31 April 1943)
 Generalleutnant Friedrich Hofmann (31 April 1943 – 8 July 1943)
 Generalleutnant Harry Hoppe (8 July 1943 – 7 November 1943)
 Generalleutnant Gotthard Fischer (7 November 1943 – 5 January 1945)
 Generalmajor Kurt Hähling (5 January 1945 – 8 May 1945)

Order of battle

1940 

 Infantry Regiment 422
 Infantry Regiment 424
 Infantry Regiment 426
 Artillery Regiment 126
 Divisions Units 126

1943 

 Grenadier Regiment 422
 Grenadier Regiment 424
 Grenadier Regiment 426
 Divisions Fusilier Battalion 126
 Artillery Regiment 126
 Divisions Units 126

See also 

 List of German Divisions in World War II

External links

Infantry divisions of Germany during World War II
Military units and formations established in 1940
Military units and formations disestablished in 1945